is a railway station on the Abukuma Express Line in the city of Fukushima, Fukushima Prefecture,  Japan.

Lines

Station layout
Senoue Station has two opposed side platforms connected by an underground passage. There is no station building, and the station is unattended.

Adjacent stations

History
Senoue Station opened on July 1, 1988.

Passenger statistics
In fiscal 2015, the station was used by an average of 169 passengers daily (boarding passengers only).

Surrounding area

See also
 List of Railway Stations in Japan

External links

  Abukuma Express home page

References

Railway stations in Fukushima Prefecture
Abukuma Express Line
Railway stations in Japan opened in 1988
Fukushima (city)